Vilis Cimmermanis (29 December 1896 – 29 May 1936) was a Latvian long-distance runner. He competed at the 1924 Summer Olympics and the 1928 Summer Olympics.

References

External links
 

1896 births
1936 deaths
Athletes (track and field) at the 1924 Summer Olympics
Athletes (track and field) at the 1928 Summer Olympics
Latvian male long-distance runners
Latvian male marathon runners
Olympic athletes of Latvia
Place of birth missing